Samuel Dexter LeCompte was born in Dorchester County, Maryland, USA, on December 13, 1814. He was a lawyer and judge in Kansas.

He graduated from Jefferson College (now Washington & Jefferson College) in 1834.

He was married in 1841 to Camilla Anderson. They had five children.

He was chief justice of the Supreme Court of the Kansas Territory from 1854 to 1859. He served in the Kansas Legislature from 1867 to 1868.

LeCompte died in Kansas City, Missouri, on April 24, 1888.

The city of Lecompton, Kansas, official capital of the Kansas Territory, was named in honor of Samuel LeCompte.

References

1814 births
1888 deaths
Washington & Jefferson College alumni
Chief Justices of the Kansas Supreme Court
19th-century American judges